Hirohisa (written: 裕久, 博久 or 浩久) is a masculine Japanese given name. Notable people with the name include:

, Japanese politician
, Japanese musician
, Japanese film director and screenwriter

Japanese masculine given names